Saintly Sinners is a 1962 American comedy-drama film directed by Jean Yarbrough and starring Don Beddoe, Ellen Corby, Stanley Clements and Paul Bryar.

Plot
Ex-con Joseph Braden has his car temporarily stolen by a pair of bank robbers who hide their loot in the vehicle's spare tire. After the car is repossessed, it's sold to the kindly Rev. Daniel Sheridan, who immediately sets out on a fishing trip.

Cast
 Don Beddoe as Father Dan Sheridan
 Ellen Corby as Mrs. McKenzie
 Stanley Clements as Slim
 Paul Bryar as Duke
 Addison Richards as Monsignor Craig
 Ron Hagerthy as Joe Breaden
 Jacklyn O'Donnell as Sue Braeden (as Erin O'Donnell)
 Clancy Cooper as Idaho Murphy 
 William Fawcett as Horsefly Brown
 Earle Hodgins as Uncle Clete
 Norman Leavitt as Pittheus (as Norm Leavitt)
 Willis Bouchey as Police Chief Harrihan

See also
 List of American films of 1962

References

External links

1962 films
American black-and-white films
1962 comedy films
American comedy films
Films produced by Edward Small
1960s English-language films
Films directed by Jean Yarbrough
Films scored by Richard LaSalle
United Artists films
1960s American films